Lake Mataro is an ancient lake in the Andes. It is one of the ancient lakes of the Altiplano like Lake Minchin, Lake Ballivian and Lake Cabana. It existed between 2.8 and 1.8 million years ago.

The Altiplano is a  highland in South America, between the Eastern Cordillera and the Western Cordillera of the Andes. The most important lacustrine bodies of today are Lake Titicaca, Lake Poopo, Salar de Coipasa and Salar de Uyuni. During summer the ITCZ moves south and brings precipitation to the Altiplano, with the amount decreasing from north to south. In the past, several large lakes formed in the Altiplano, including Lake Minchin, Lake Ballivian, Lake Cabana and Lake Mataro. Additional ancient lakes have been identified. A tectonic event resulting into a relative uplift of the Eastern Cordillera with respect to the Altiplano may have triggered a lowering of the terrain and facilitated the formation of Mataro and Cabana.

Deposits of the lake have been found mostly in the northeastern part of its basin and the lake is named after an outcrop in the Mataro Chico locality. The erosion surface of Lake Mataro and Lake Cabana is found in both the northern and central Altiplano, implying that the Ulloma-Capalla pass did not exist back then.

Both Mataro and Cabana were named by Lavenu and others in 1984. It formed a single large lake over the central and northern Altiplano. Progressive erosion of the outlet of Lake Titicaca may be responsible for the observed reduction of the levels of the northern paleolakes during time, as it allowed water from the northern lakes to spill into the southern ones.

Lake Mataro along with Lake Cabana and Lake Ballivian was first debatably dated to be late Pliocene-mid/early Quaternary in age. Proposed ages include 1.8 and 2.8 million years ago, lake deposits lie on top of a 2.8 ± 0.4 million years old volcanic ash layer. The Mataro formation has been dated at 1.6 million years ago.

The lake existed at the same time as the Calvario glaciation over 2.8 million years ago, when the glaciation was ending. The Ayo Ayo and Purapurani formations are coeval with the existence of Lake Mataro, as is the differentiation of Hyalella amphipods; these are freshwater animals.

References

Sources 

 
 

Geology of Bolivia
Geology of Peru
Former lakes of South America
Lakes of Bolivia
Lakes of Peru
Pleistocene